Linostomella is a monotypic genus of fungi within the Boliniaceae family containing the sole species Linostomella sphaerosperma.

External links

Monotypic Sordariomycetes genera
Boliniales